The 2006–07 Singapore Slingers season was the 1st season of the franchise in the National Basketball League (NBL). 

The Singapore Slingers were the first Asian team to compete in Australia's National Basketball League (NBL). The Slingers play their home games at the 10,000 seat Singapore Indoor Stadium in Kallang, Singapore.

Roster

Depth chart

Regular season 

The regular season of the National Basketball League consisted of 33 games, with each team playing each other 3 times. Slinger’s will play 16 home games and 17 away games. The Slingers opening match is against the Adelaide 36ers at Singapore's home which is the Singapore Indoor Stadium.

Ladder 
This is the ladder at the end of season, before the finals. The top 8 teams qualified for the finals series.

The NBL tie-breaker system as outlined in the NBL Rules and Regulations states that in the case of an identical win-loss record, the results in games played between the teams will determine order of seeding.

Regular season 

|- style="background-color:#ccffcc;"
| 1
| 20 September
| Adelaide
| W 98–91
| Marquin Chandler (21)
| Helms, Melmeth (8) 
| Chandler, Melmeth, Trahair (3)
| Singapore Indoor Stadium
| 1–0
|- style="background-color:#ffcccc;"
| 2
| 22 September
| @ Perth
| L 94–82
| Mike Helms (24)
| Ben Knight (11)
| Mike Helms (5)
| Challenge Stadium
| 1–1
|- style="background-color:#ffcccc;"
| 3
| 27 September
| Perth
| L 100–109
| Mike Helms (38)
| Ben Melmeth (10)
| Marquin Chandler (4)
| Singapore Indoor Stadium
| 1–2

|- style="background-color:#ccffcc;"
| 4
| 9 October
| West Sydney
| W 126–89
| Marquin Chandler (28)
| Ben Knight (10)
| Ben Knight (7)
| Singapore Indoor Stadium
| 2–2
|- style="background-color:#ffcccc;"
| 5
| 12 October
| Wollongong
| L 87–105
| Mike Helms (14)
| Ben Knight (13)
| Chandler, L.Davidson, Kench (2)
| Singapore Indoor Stadium
| 2–3
|- style="background-color:#ffcccc;"
| 6
| 14 October
| @ Melbourne
| L 113–102
| Mike Helms (24)
| Ben Knight (8)
| Marquin Chandler (4)
| State Netball Hockey Centre
| 2–4
|- style="background-color:#ccffcc;"
| 7
| 18 October
| South
| W 104–96
| Marquin Chandler (32)
| Chandler, Knight (9)
| Brad Davidson (5)
| Singapore Indoor Stadium
| 3–4
|- style="background-color:#ffcccc;"
| 8
| 20 October
| @ West Sydney
| L 97–80
| Mike Helms (21)
| Mike Helms (11)
| Helms, Vasiljevic (3)
| State Sports Centre
| 3–5
|- style="background-color:#ffcccc;"
| 9
| 26 October
| Cairns
| L 98–102
| Mike Helms (27)
| Ben Knight (11)
| Brad Davidson (3)
| Singapore Indoor Stadium 
| 3–6
|- style="background-color:#ffcccc;"
| 10
| 29 October 
| Sydney
| L 83–90
| Mike Helms (28)
| L.Davidson, Knight (8)
| Aaron Trahair (6)
| Singapore Indoor Stadium 
| 3–7

|- style="background-color:#ffcccc;"
| 11
| 3 November
| @ Cairns
| L 98–90
| Mike Helms (20)
| Ben Knight (9)
| Chandler, Helms, Trahair (3)
| Cairns Convention Centre
| 3–8
|- style="background-color:#ffcccc;"
| 12
| 27 November
| @ Brisbane
| L 131–93
| Ben Melmeth (21)
| Ben Knight (11)
| Ben Knight (3)
| Brisbane Convention Centre
| 3–9
|- style="background-color:#ffcccc;"
| 13
| 29 November
| @ Townsville
| L 120–101
| Marquin Chandler (23)
| Larry Davidson (11)
| Helms, Trahair (4)
| Townsville Entertainment Centre
| 3–10

|- style="background-color:#ccffcc;"
| 14
| 10 December
| @ Wollongong
| W 84–110
| Marquin Chandler (31)
| Marquin Chandler (11)
| B.Davidson, Helms (6)
| WIN Entertainment Centre
| 4–10
|- style="background-color:#ccffcc;"
| 15
| 13 December
| New Zealand
| W 111–94
| Marquin Chandler (34)
| Ben Knight (7)
| Brad Davidson (4)
| Singapore Indoor Stadium
| 5–10
|- style="background-color:#ffcccc;"
| 16
| 16 December
| @ Adelaide
| L 102–100
| Chandler, Helms (20)
| Ben Knight (14)
| Chandler, B.Davidson (5)
| Adelaide Arena
| 5–11
|- style="background-color:#ccffcc;"
| 17
| 20 December
| West Sydney 
| W 115–93
| Mike Helms (31)
| Marquin Chandler (10)
| Brad Davidson (6)
| Singapore Indoor Stadium
| 6–11
|- style="background-color:#ffcccc;"
| 18
| 27 December
| @ Perth
| L 105–88
| Marquin Chandler (26)
| Ben Melmeth (10)
| Ben Melmeth (5)
| Challenge Stadium
| 6–12
|- style="background-color:#ccffcc;"
| 19
| 29 December
| New Zealand
| W 109–96
| Mike Helms (31)
| Ben Melmeth (13)
| Melmeth, Trahair (5)
| Singapore Indoor Stadium
| 7–12

|- style="background-color:#ffcccc;"
| 20
| 3 January 
| South
| L 85–110
| Mike Helms (17)
| Ben Knight (14)
| Brad Davidson (4)
| Singapore Indoor Stadium
| 7–13
|- style="background-color:#ccffcc;"
| 21
| 4 January
| Townsville
| W 114–103
| Mike Helms (34)
| Ben Melmeth (14)
| B.Davidson, Trahair (4)
| Singapore Indoor Stadium
| 8–13
|- style="background-color:#ffcccc;"
| 22
| 6 January
| @ Brisbane
| L 131–116
| Marquin Chandler (31)
| Ben Melmeth (10)
| Marquin Chandler (5)
| Brisbane Convention Centre
| 8–14
|- style="background-color:#ccffcc;"
| 23
| 10 January
| Sydney
| W 96–88
| Marquin Chandler (24)
| Chandler, Knight (6)
| Mike Helms (5)
| Singapore Indoor Stadium
| 9–14
|- style="background-color:#ccffcc;"
| 24
| 12 January
| @ Cairns
| W 101–113
| Marquin Chandler (30)
| Chandler, Melmeth (7)
| Brad Davidson (4)
| Cairns Convention Centre
| 10–14
|- style="background-color:#ffcccc;"
| 25
| 13 January
| @ Townsville
| L 140–100
| Brad Davidson (22)
| Ben Melmeth (8)
| Ben Knight (5)
| Townsville Entertainment Centre
| 10–15
|- style="background-color:#ffcccc;"
| 26
| 17 January
| Melbourne
| L 89–96
| Marquin Chandler (24)
| Mike Helms (11)
| Brad Davidson (4)
| Singapore Indoor Stadium
| 10–16
|- style="background-color:#ffcccc;"
| 27
| 24 January
| @ New Zealand
| L 103–100
| Mike Helms (26)
| Ben Melmeth (7)
| Brad Davidson (6)
| North Shore Events Centre
| 10–17
|- style="background-color:#ffcccc;"
| 28
| 27 January
| @ Melbourne
| L 125–114
| Ben Knight (33)
| Ben Knight (9)
| Brad Davidson (7)
| State Netball Hockey Centre
| 10–18
|- style="background-color:#ccffcc;"
| 29
| 31 January
| Adelaide
| W 105–100
| Aaron Trahair (27)
| Ben Knight (20)
| B.Davidson, Melmeth (3)
| Singapore Indoor Stadium
| 11–18

|- style="background-color:#ccffcc;"
| 30
| 2 February 
| @ Wollongong
| W 93–96
| Mike Helms (26)
| Ben Knight (13)
| Aaron Trahair (7)
| WIN Entertainment Centre
| 12–18
|- style="background-color:#ccffcc;"
| 31
| 3 February
| @ South
| W 100–114
| Aaron Trahair (28)
| Ben Melmeth (10)
| Brad Davidson (12)
| Vodafone Arena
| 13–18
|- style="background-color:#ffcccc;"
| 32
| 7 February
| Brisbane
| L 102–134
| Mike Helms (30)
| Pero Vasiljevic (6)
| Aaron Trahair (6)
| Singapore Indoor Stadium
| 13–19
|- style="background-color:#ffcccc;"
| 33
| 11 February
| @ Sydney
| L 102–76
| Mike Helms (29)
| Larry Davidson (8)
| Aaron Trahair (4)
| Sydney Entertainment Centre
| 13–20

Postseason 

The elimination finals were played over 4 days. The first two teams automatically went ahead to the semi finals. The winner of Game 1 went on to play the 4th placed team, while the winner of Game 2 went on to play the 3rd placed team.

Finals 

|- style="background-color:#ffcccc;"
| 1
| 14 February 
|  @ Townsville
| L 106–93
| Ben Knight (21)
| Ben Knight (17)
| B.Davidson, Trahair (6)
| Townsville Entertainment Centre
| 0–1

Awards

Player of the Week 

 Round 12: Marquin Chandler – 31 points, 11 rebounds, 3 assists, 2 steal and 3 blocks vs. Wollongong Hawks @ WIN Entertainment Centre

Singapore Slingers Awards 
 Most Valuable Player: Mike Helms

2006–07 NBL All-Star Game 

 World All-Star: Mike Helms – 17 points, 3 rebounds, 2 assists and 1 steal vs. Aussie All-Stars @ Adelaide Arena

See also 

 2006–07 NBL season
 Singapore Slingers

References

External links 

 Official Website

Singapore Slingers season
Singapore Slingers seasons